(My God, how long, ah, how long), 155, is a church cantata by Johann Sebastian Bach. He first performed it in Weimar on the second Sunday after Epiphany, on 19 January 1716.

History and words 
On 2 March 1714 Bach was appointed concertmaster of the Weimar court capelle of the co-reigning dukes Wilhelm Ernst and Ernst August of Saxe-Weimar. As concertmaster, he assumed the principal responsibility for composing new works, specifically cantatas for the Schlosskirche (palace church or ducal chapel), on a monthly schedule. He wrote this cantata for the Second Sunday after Epiphany.

The prescribed readings for the Sunday were taken from the Epistle to the Romans, "We have several gifts", and from the Gospel of John, the Marriage at Cana. He expanded one thought from the gospel: Jesus is still hidden, but the "soul" may trust that he will appear at the right time. The poet uses images of wine to allude to the miracle at the marriage, such as "" (that the measure of tears is always fully granted, the wine of joy is lacking). The closing chorale is stanza 12 of "Es ist das Heil uns kommen her" by Speratus.

Bach first performed the cantata on 19 January 1716 in the ducal chapel. He performed it again in a revised version in his first year in Leipzig on 16 January 1724.

Scoring and structure 

Similar to other Weimar cantatas, the work is scored for soprano, alto, tenor  and bass soloists, a four-part choir for the chorale only if at all, an obbligato bassoon, two violins, viola, and basso continuo. It is structured in five movements.

 Recitative (soprano): 
 Aria (alto, tenor): 
 Recitative (bass): 
 Aria (soprano): 
 Chorale:

Music 

The opening recitative, speaking of longing and waiting, expands expressively on a throbbing pedal point of 11 measures, moving only on the words "" mentioning "joy" (the lack of joy, though), only to sink back for the final "" (almost all my confidence has drained away). In the following duet, an unusual obbligato bassoon plays virtuoso figurations in a wide range of two and one half octaves (including a truly remarkable G0), whereas the voices sing together, for most of the time in homophony. Movement 3 speaks words of consolation. In the final aria, lively dotted rhythms in the strings and later in the voice illustrate "" (Throw yourself, my heart, only throw yourself into the loving arms of the Highest), the rhythms even appear in the continuo several times, while the strings rest on long chords. The tune of an Easter chorale from the 15th century closes the cantata in a four-part setting.

Recordings 

 Die Bach Kantate Vol. 22, Helmuth Rilling, Gächinger Kantorei, Bach-Collegium Stuttgart, Ingeborg Reichelt, Norma Lerer, Friedrich Melzer, Hanns-Friedrich Kunz, Hänssler 1971
 J. S. Bach: Das Kantatenwerk – Sacred Cantatas Vol. 8, Nikolaus Harnoncourt, Tölzer Knabenchor, Concentus Musicus Wien, soprano soloist of the Tölzer Knabenchor, Paul Esswood, Kurt Equiluz, Thomas Hampson, Teldec 1985
 J. S. Bach: Complete Cantatas Vol. 3, Ton Koopman, Amsterdam Baroque Orchestra & Choir, Caroline Stam, Elisabeth von Magnus, Paul Agnew, Klaus Mertens, Antoine Marchand 1995
 J. S. Bach: Cantatas Vol. 5, Masaaki Suzuki, Bach Collegium Japan, Midori Suzuki, Yoshikazu Mera, Makoto Sakurada, Peter Kooy, BIS 1997
 Bach Cantatas Vol. 19: New York, John Eliot Gardiner, Monteverdi Choir, English Baroque Soloists, Joanne Lunn, Richard Wyn Roberts, Julian Podger, Gerald Finley, Soli Deo Gloria 2000

References

Sources 
 Mein Gott, wie lang, ach lange? BWV 155: performance by the Netherlands Bach Society (video and background information)
 
 Mein Gott, wie lang, ach lange BWV 155; BC A 32 / Sacred cantata (2nd Sunday of Epiphany) Bach Digital
 Cantata BWV 155 Mein Gott, wie lang, ach lange history, scoring, sources for text and music, translations to various languages, discography, discussion, Bach Cantatas Website
 BWV 155 Mein Gott, wie lang, ach lange English translation, University of Vermont
 BWV 155 Mein Gott, wie lang, ach lange text, scoring, University of Alberta
 Luke Dahn: BWV 155.5 bach-chorales.com

Church cantatas by Johann Sebastian Bach
1716 compositions